Cllr Norman Hillis is an Ulster Unionist Party (UUP) politician from Northern Ireland, who was a Member of the Northern Ireland Assembly (MLA) for  East Londonderry  from 2003 to 2007.

Hillis was educated at Coleraine Academical Institution and the former Coleraine Technical College and has been active in the business community of Portrush where he has been president of the resort's Chamber of Commerce and Coleraine Lions Club. He is an Ulster Unionist Party councillor on  Causeway Coast and Glens  Borough Council (Formerly Coleraine Borough Council) elected in 1993, and was Mayor of Coleraine from 1999 to 2000, and from 2010–11.

Hillis was elected as a member for the Northern Ireland Assembly constituency of East Londonderry but lost his seat in the 2007 election. He is UUP Representative on the Confederation of European Councillors and spokesperson for the party on matters relating to North/South and East/West issues.

Hillis is a Member of Coleraine's  District Policing Partnership (DPP) and is a Justice of the Peace. He is a former Chairman of the Coleraine branch of the Ulster Young Unionist Council.

External links
 Profile, stratagem-ni.com
 Profile, uup.org

References

Year of birth missing (living people)
Living people
Ulster Unionist Party MLAs
Northern Ireland MLAs 2003–2007
Mayors of Coleraine
Ulster Unionist Party councillors